The 2012 Cork Senior Football Championship was the 114th staging of the Cork Senior Football Championship since its establishment by the Cork County Board in 1887. The championship began on 20 March 2012 and ended on 28 October 2012.

University College Cork entered the championship as the defending champions, however, they were defeated by Duhallow.

On 28 October 2012, Castlehaven won the championship following a 1-07 to 0-09 defeat of Duhallow in the final. This was their 4th championship title overall and their first title since 2003.

Duhallow's Donnacha O'Connor was the championship's top scorer with 0-48.

Team changes

To Championship

Promoted from the Cork Premier Intermediate Football Championship
 Newmarket

From Championship

Relegated to the Cork Premier Intermediate Football Championship
 Valley Rovers

Results

Divisional section

Round 1

Round 2

Round 3

Relegation playoff

Round 4

Quarter-finals

Semi-finals

Final

Championship statistics

Top scorers

Top scorers overall

Top scorers in a single game

Miscellaneous

 Castlehaven win the title for the first time since 2003.
 Duhallow qualify for the final for the first time since 1998.
 St. Finbarr's recorded their first championship defeat of Nemo Rangers since 1989.

References

External link

 2012 Cork Senior Football Championship results

Cork Senior Football Championship